Mandapathinkadavu is a village located at Kattakada Taluk, Thiruvananthapuram district, Kerala, India.

The village is situated on the banks of the river Neyyar. Neyyar is one of the good river in Kerala. Neyyar Dam is situated near Mandapathinkadavu.  It is in Ottasekharamangalam panchayath. Kuravara, Poozhanadu, Pakkottukonam, Plavoor, Kunnanadu, Perekkonam, Valicode are some neighbouring places of Mandapathinkadavu. One of the famous Subrahmanya temple "Kunnil Shri Subrahmanya Temple" is in Mandapathinkadavu.

One can reach there through Thiruvananthapuram to Kattakkada; Six kilometres from Kattakkada, or from Neyyattinkara - Ottasekharamangalam, then two kilometres from Ottasekharamangalam.

References

Villages in Thiruvananthapuram district